The 2015 season is the Harrisburg City Islanders's 12th season of competitive soccer - its twelfth season in the third division of American soccer and its fifth season in United Soccer League since the league was first created with the City Islanders as one of the original 10 founder-members.

Anniversary Logo 

For the 2015 season, a new logo was developed to commemoration of the Islanders' 12th anniversary. According to the press release: "The design was developed to encompass the iconic Pennsylvania keystone; the Harrisburg Capitol building, which serves as the backdrop to the Skyline Sports Complex, and 12 stars, representing 12 seasons as a club and the 12th man on the field [the fans]."
Club President, Tiago Lopes believes, “The 12th season of franchise history is a big milestone. This will be a season entirely dedicated to our fans. We wanted to do something to acknowledge and praise them for all the support. This season will be themed “11 and you,” acknowledging what it takes to accomplish wins and titles is the 12th element on the field; the importance of having the fans, partners and the community in support of our team.”

Roster 

Updated as of August 19, 2015. Roster listed here represents all players who are on the official roster and have made appearances for Harrisburg during the 2015 season.

Transfers

In

Out

Loan in

Competitions

Preseason 

2015 Harrisburg City Islanders Schedule

USL

Standings (Eastern Conference)

Results 

All times in Eastern Time.

2015 Harrisburg City Islanders Regular Season Schedule

Results summary

U.S. Open Cup 

The City Islanders competed in the 2015 edition of the U.S. Open Cup. They were eliminated in the third round of competition after conceding three goals in extra time to the Rochester Rhinos.

Friendlies 
The 2015 annual friendly with the Philadelphia Union was the final friendly match of the two clubs MLS-USL affiliation. The match was held in Lancaster, Pennsylvania and drew a record crowd for an Islanders home match of 6,546 attendees.

Statistics 
As of September 20, 2015.

Numbers in parentheses denote appearances as substitute.
Players with names struck through and marked  left the club during the playing season.
Players with names in italics were on loan from Philadelphia Union for individual matches with Harrisburg.
Players with names marked * were on loan from another club for the whole of their season with Harrisburg.
League denotes USL regular season
Playoffs denotes USL playoffs

Goalkeepers 
As of September 20, 2015.

Honors 
 Week 8 Team of the Week: M Enric Valles Honorable Mention: M José Barril
 Week 9 Team of the Week: D Dante Leverock Honorable Mention: D Ken Tribbett
 Week 14 Team of the Week: M Yann Ekra
 Week 16 Team of the Week: F Cardel Benbow
 Week 17 Team of the Week: M Enric Valles
 Week 19 Team of the Week: F Craig Foster and M Jason Plumhoff
 Week 21 Team of the Week: M Yann Ekra

 Week 23 Team of the Week: M Jose Barril and F Craig Foster
 Week 27 Team of the Week: M Jason Plumhoff
 USL Rookie of the Year Finalist: D Ken Tribbett

References 

2015 USL season
Penn FC seasons
American soccer clubs 2015 season
2015 in sports in Pennsylvania